An account of the lives and works of the most eminent Spanish painters, sculptors and architects is a book written by the Spanish painter Antonio Palomino and dedicated to the biographies of the most eminent artists who worked in Spain during the so-called Siglo de Oro, the golden age of Spanish art.

It was published for the first time in the original Spanish edition in 1724, entitled El parnaso español pintoresco y laureado and appearing as the third and last volume of Palomino's El museo pictorico y escala optica, featuring also biographies of Italian artists who worked in Spain (Pietro Torrigiano, Tiziano, Sofonisba Anguissola, Federico Zuccari, Luca Giordano and many others) as well as Flemish artists (Antonio Moro, Pieter Paul Rubens). The book includes the first biographies ever published of many Spanish artists, Diego Velázquez among others, and was translated and published in English, French and German during the 18th century; the English translation appeared in 1739.

The book has been described as "the starting point for all students of Spanish painting".

Artists treated

Note: page numbers next to artists' names refer to the English edition of 1739 (see external links below).

References

External links
Las vidas de los pintores y estatuarios eminentes españoles, que con sus heroycas obras, han ilustrado la nacion (Spanish version, published in London in 1742)
An account of the lives and works of the most eminent Spanish painters, sculptors and architects, tr. (by U. Price) from the Musæum pictorium (English version, 1739)

Art history books
Palomino
Account
1724 books
Architecture books